Pierce County is a county located in the southeastern part of the U.S. state of Georgia. As of the 2020 census, the population was 19,716. The county seat is Blackshear.

Pierce County is part of the Waycross, Georgia Micropolitan Statistical Area.

History
Pierce County is named for Franklin Pierce, fourteenth President of the United States. It was created December 18, 1857, from Appling and Ware counties.

Geography

The northeastern third of Pierce County, bordered by a line from just west of Mershon to just south of Bristol, then south to just north of  Blackshear, and then heading due east, is located in the Little Satilla River sub-basin of the St. Marys River-Satilla River basin. The southern two-thirds of the county is located in the Satilla River sub-basin of the St. Marys-Satilla River basin.

Major highways
  U.S. Highway 84
  State Route 15
  State Route 32
  State Route 38
  State Route 121
  State Route 203

Adjacent counties
 Appling County - north
 Wayne County - northeast
 Brantley County - southeast
 Ware County - west
 Bacon County - northwest

Demographics

2000 census
As of the census of 2000, there were 15,636 people, 5,958 households, and 4,438 families living in the county. There were 6,719 housing units at an average density of 20 per square mile (8/km2). The racial makeup of the county was 86.90% White, 10.91% Black or African American, 0.26% Native American, 0.18% Asian, 0.05% Pacific Islander, 0.97% from other races, and 0.73% from two or more races. 2.28% of the population were Hispanic or Latino of any race.

As of the census of 2000, the largest ancestry groups were:
71.14% of people in Pierce County were of English descent, 11.37% were of Scots-Irish descent and 10.91% were of African descent.

There were 5,958 households, out of which 34.70% had children under the age of 18 living with them, 59.00% were married couples living together, 11.60% had a female householder with no husband present, and 25.50% were non-families. 23.10% of all households were made up of individuals, and 9.80% had someone living alone who was 65 years of age or older. The average household size was 2.61 and the average family size was 3.06.

In the county, the population was spread out, with 26.70% under the age of 18, 8.50% from 18 to 24, 28.10% from 25 to 44, 24.50% from 45 to 64, and 12.20% who were 65 years of age or older. The median age was 36 years. For every 100 females, there were 96.90 males. For every 100 females age 18 and over, there were 92.40 males.

The median income for a household in the county was $29,895, and the median income for a family was $35,903. Males had a median income of $28,331 versus $19,771 for females. The per capita income for the county was $14,230. About 14.40% of families and 18.40% of the population were below the poverty line, including 25.50% of those under age 18 and 22.40% of those age 65 or over.

2010 census
As of the 2010 United States Census, there were 18,758 people, 7,083 households, and 5,268 families living in the county. The racial makeup of the county was 86.9% white, 8.9% black or African American, 0.4% American Indian, 0.3% Asian, 0.1% Pacific islander, 2.1% from other races, and 1.4% from two or more races. Those of Hispanic or Latino origin made up 4.7% of the population. 
Of the 7,083 households, 37.7% had children under the age of 18 living with them, 55.7% were married couples living together, 13.6% had a female householder with no husband present, 25.6% were non-families, and 21.8% of all households were made up of individuals. The average household size was 2.63 and the average family size was 3.05. The median age was 38.4 years.

The median income for a household in the county was $37,062 and the median income for a family was $47,157. Males had a median income of $38,770 versus $26,510 for females. The per capita income for the county was $18,283. About 13.6% of families and 15.4% of the population were below the poverty line, including 20.3% of those under age 18 and 14.9% of those age 65 or over.

2020 census

As of the 2020 United States census, there were 19,716 people, 7,048 households, and 5,319 families residing in the county.

Media
 The Blackshear Times (weekly newspaper)
 The Pierce County Press (weekly newspaper)
 Waycross Journal-Herald (daily newspaper)
 WKUB 105.1FM  (Country radio)
 WWUF 97.7FM   (Oldies radio)
 WSFN  AM 1350 (Sports radio)
 WAYX  AM 1230  (News Talk radio)

Communities

Cities
 Blackshear
 Offerman
 Patterson

Unincorporated communities
 Bristol
 Mershon
 Otter Creek
 Walkerville

Politics

See also

 National Register of Historic Places listings in Pierce County, Georgia
List of counties in Georgia

References

 
Georgia (U.S. state) counties
1857 establishments in Georgia (U.S. state)
Waycross, Georgia micropolitan area
Populated places established in 1857